Colonel William Eagleson Gordon, VC, CBE (4 May 1866 – 10 March 1941) was a Scottish British Army officer and recipient of the Victoria Cross, the highest and most prestigious award for gallantry in the face of the enemy that can be awarded to British and Commonwealth forces.  He is the older brother of Archibald Alexander Gordon, who received the Legion of Honour and Order of Leopold.

Early military career
Gordon was born at Bridge of Allan in 1866, and joined the militia in 1886 as lieutenant in the Royal Artillery. He was commissioned as a second lieutenant in the Gordon Highlanders on 6 June 1888, promoted to lieutenant on 1 September 1891, and took part in the Chitral Expedition with the 1st battalion of his regiment in 1895. Two years later they served in the Tirah Campaign on the North West Frontier of British India 1897–1898, during which he was promoted to captain on 19 October 1897.

He served as adjutant of the 1st battalion from 21 January 1899 and throughout the Second Boer War (1899–1902), when the battalion was posted to South Africa. They were part of the force sent to relieve the siege of Kimberley, and saw action at the Battle of Magersfontein in December 1899, where Gordon was wounded. He then served in the Orange Free State from February to May 1900, and took part in the battles of Paardeberg (February 1900), Poplar Grove, Driefontein (March 1900), Hontnek, Vet River and Hand River. Transferring to Transvaal, the battalion was again in action at Doornkop in May 1900, where they suffered severe losses, then took part in the battles of Belfast and Lydenburg (August 1900). The battalion stayed in South Africa throughout the war, which ended with the Peace of Vereeniging in June 1902. Four months later 475 officers and men of the 1st battalion left Cape Town on the SS Salamis in late September 1902, arriving at Southampton in late October, when the battalion was posted to Glasgow.

Citation
Gordon was 34 years old, and a captain in the 1st Battalion, The Gordon Highlanders during the Second Boer War when the following deed took place near Krugersdorp, South Africa for which he (together with Captain David Reginald Younger) was awarded the VC:

His Victoria Cross is on display at the Gordon Highlanders Museum, Aberdeen, Scotland.

Later military career
Gordon was brevetted lieutenant-colonel in the Gordon Highlanders in 1907. Gordon also served as Aide-de-camp to King George V. On 4 May 1923 Gordon was placed on retired pay having achieved the rank of Major although as previously noted he was a brevet Lieutenant Colonel.

Honours

Arms

References

Monuments to Courage (David Harvey, 1999)
The Register of the Victoria Cross (This England, 1997)
Scotland's Forgotten Valour (Graham Ross, 1995)
Victoria Crosses of the Anglo-Boer War (Ian Uys, 2000)

External links
Location of grave and VC medal (Surrey)
Angloboerwar.com

Second Boer War recipients of the Victoria Cross
British recipients of the Victoria Cross
Gordon Highlanders officers
1866 births
1941 deaths
British military personnel of the Chitral Expedition
British military personnel of the Tirah campaign
British Army personnel of the Second Boer War
British Army personnel of World War I
Commanders of the Order of the British Empire
People from Bridge of Allan
British Army recipients of the Victoria Cross